Clifton Jones (born 26 July 1937, St. Andrew, Jamaica) is a Jamaican actor known for his roles in British television.

Career
He played the role of Jo's boyfriend in the original Theatre Workshop production of Shelagh Delaney's A Taste of Honey in 1958.

His first regular role was in Emergency Ward 10. He actually had an uncredited part in 1959. In 1961, he became a regular in the series as Dr Jeremiah Sanders. He appeared in the series for nearly one year.
Another medical role saw him appear as Dr Ferguson in the comedy series Doctor in Charge.

His most prominent role is probably that of David Kano in the first season of the 1970s science fiction TV series Space: 1999.

Jones' other TV credits include Dixon of Dock Green, Z-Cars, Public Eye, Danger Man, Man in a Suitcase, The Troubleshooters, The Persuaders!, The Onedin Line, Survivors, 1990 and The Professionals.

His film roles included appearances in The V.I.P.s (1963), Only When I Larf (1968), Decline and Fall... of a Birdwatcher (1968), Joanna (1968), Innocent Bystanders (1972), Father, Dear Father (1973), The Great McGonagall (1974) and Sheena (1984). He also voiced the character of Blackavar in the animated feature-film Watership Down (1978).

Partial filmography
Life in Emergency Ward 10 (1959)  – (uncredited)
The V.I.P.s (1963)  – Jamaican Passenger
Only When I Larf (1968)  – General Sakut
Decline and Fall... of a Birdwatcher (1968)  – Chokey
Joanna (1968)  – Black Detective
The Breaking of Bumbo (1970)  – Black Actor
Innocent Bystanders (1972)  – Hetherton
Father, Dear Father (1973)  – Larry
The Great McGonagall (1975)  – King Theebaw / Policeman / Clerk of the Court / Mr Stewart's Assistant / Zulu Chief / Ruffian / Fop
Watership Down (1978)  – Blackavar (voice)
Sheena (1984)  – King Jabalani
China Moon (1994)  – Dr. Ocampo

References

External links

1937 births
20th-century British male actors
British male film actors
British male television actors
British male voice actors
Migrants from British Jamaica to the United Kingdom
Jamaican male film actors
Jamaican male television actors
Living people
20th-century Jamaican male actors